Cham Arabi-ye Pataveh (also Romanized as Cham ‘Arabī-ye Pātāveh; also known as Cham ‘Arabī and Cham Gharbī) is a village in Pataveh Rural District, Pataveh District, Dana County, Kohgiluyeh and Boyer-Ahmad Province, Iran. At the 2006 census, its population was 145, in 23 families.

References 

Populated places in Dana County